Carabus is a genus of beetles in family Carabidae. The genus is highly diverse with 94 subgenera, 897 species and 2300 subspecies, thus is the largest genus in the subfamily Carabinae. The vast majority are native to the Palearctic, but 11 Nearctic species are also known. These are nocturnal, predatory beetles that feed on snails, earthworms, and caterpillars. Most Carabus species were thought to have inhabited the Eurasian forest, but the species' low dispersal abilities altered the distribution of lineages within the genus.

Diet
Adult  Carabus feeds on both small live and dead animals such as slugs, snails, earthworms, and insects in all stages, sometimes dead vertebrates. The ways of feeding on snails are different for their adaptations, as macrocephalic beetles feed snails by crushing shells, and stenocephalic beetles feed snails by inserting the head into the shell.

Species
Carabus contains the following 897 species:

A

 Carabus aba Kalab, 2002
 Carabus abbreviatus Brulle, 1835
 Carabus absonus Cavazzuti & Rapuzzi, 2005
 Carabus acutithorax Deuve, 1989
 Carabus adamsi M.Adams, 1817
 Carabus adangensis Gottwald, 1983
 Carabus adelphus Rost, 1892
 Carabus adolescens Hauser, 1925
 Carabus aeneocupreus Hauser, 1932
 Carabus aeneolus Morawitz, 1886
 Carabus aeruginosus Fischer, 1822
 Carabus agamemnon Breuning, 1943
 Carabus agnatus Ganglbauer, 1889
 Carabus ajax Breuning, 1933
 Carabus akinini Morawitz, 1886
 Carabus alagoensoides Mandl, 1975
 Carabus alajensis Semenov, 1897
 Carabus alanstivelli (Morvan, 1981)
 Carabus albrechti Morawitz, 1862
 Carabus alexandrae Semenov, 1887
 Carabus alexpuchneri Kleinfeld & Puchner, 2011
 Carabus aliai Escalera, 1944
 Carabus allegroi Cavazzuti & Rapuzzi, 2007
 Carabus alpestris Sturm, 1815
 Carabus alpherakii Semenov, 1898
 Carabus alysidotus Illiger, 1798
 Carabus anami Ledoux, 1977
 Carabus anatinus Imura, 2019
 Carabus anatolicus Chaudoir, 1857
 Carabus anchocephalus Reitter, 1896
 Carabus andreiianus Deuve, 2007
 Carabus angustus Roeschke, 1898
 Carabus anhuinus Imura, 1996
 Carabus anlongensis Deuve & Tian, 2006
 Carabus antoniettae Cavazzuti, 2002
 Carabus apollo Zolotarev, 1913
 Carabus apschuanus Rost, 1893
 Carabus arboreus Lewis, 1882
 Carabus arcadicus Gistl, 1850
 Carabus arcanus Semenov, 1898
 Carabus argenticornis Rapuzzi, 2020
 Carabus aristochroides Deuve, 1992
 Carabus armeniacus Mannerheim, 1830
 Carabus armiger Imura, 1997
 Carabus arrowi Hauser, 1913
 Carabus arrowianus Breuning, 1934
 Carabus arshanicus Kabak, 2005
 Carabus arunensis Heinertz, 1980
 Carabus arvensis Herbst, 1784
 Carabus asperatus Dejean, 1826
 Carabus augustus Bates, 1888
 Carabus aulacocnemus Semenov, 1897
 Carabus aumonti Lucas, 1849
 Carabus auratus Linnaeus, 1761
 Carabus auriculatus Putzeys, 1872
 Carabus auritus Cavazzuti, 2000
 Carabus aurocinctus Motschulsky, 1846
 Carabus aurocostulus Deuve & Kaláb, 2018
 Carabus auronitens Fabricius, 1792
 Carabus avinovi Semenov & Znojko, 1932
 Carabus azrael Semenov & Znojko, 1932

B

 Carabus baguenai Breuning, 1926
 Carabus baimanorum Deuve, 1999
 Carabus balangicus Cavazzuti, 2002
 Carabus balassogloi Dohrn, 1882
 Carabus balkaricus Belousov & Abdurakhmanov, 1991
 Carabus ballionis Kraatz, 1879
 Carabus banoni Dejean, 1829
 Carabus baogai Häckel & Sehnal, 2009
 Carabus bargusinensis Obydov, 2008
 Carabus baronii Heinertz, 1977
 Carabus barovskii Semenov & Znojko, 1932
 Carabus barysomus Bates, 1889
 Carabus batangicoides Deuve & Tian, 2011
 Carabus battoniensis Deuve, 1991
 Carabus belousovi Kabak, 1992
 Carabus belousovianus Imura, 2011
 Carabus benardi Breuning, 1931
 Carabus benpo Kalab, 2007
 Carabus bertolinii Kraatz, 1878
 Carabus bessarabicus Fischer, 1823
 Carabus besseri Fischer, 1822
 Carabus beybienkoi Kryzhanovskij, 1973
 Carabus biebersteini Ménétriès, 1832
 Carabus billbergi Mannerheim, 1827
 Carabus birmanus Andrewes, 1929
 Carabus biroi Csiki, 1927
 Carabus blaptoides (Kollar, 1836)
 Carabus blumenthaliellus Deuve, 1988
 Carabus blumenthaliensis Heinz & Korge, 1967
 Carabus boanoi Cavazzuti, 2003
 Carabus boeberi M.Adams, 1817
 Carabus bogdanowi Ballion, 1878
 Carabus bohemani Ménétriès, 1832
 Carabus bonvouloiri Chaudoir, 1863
 Carabus bornianus Hauser, 1922
 Carabus borodini Heinz, 1996
 Carabus boulbenianus Deuve, 1996
 Carabus bousquetellus Deuve, 1998
 Carabus boysi Tatum, 1851
 Carabus brachygnathus Deuve, 2002
 Carabus brachypedilus Morawitz, 1886
 Carabus branaungi Imura, 1999
 Carabus brandti Faldermann, 1835
 Carabus breuningi Csiki, 1927
 Carabus breuningianus Lemoult, 1930
 Carabus brezinai Deuve, 1994
 Carabus brinevi Kabak, 2014
 Carabus brosciformis Semenov, 1897
 Carabus broukpytlik Brezina & Häckel, 2004
 Carabus bruggeianus Deuve, 1992
 Carabus buddaicus Semenov, 1887
 Carabus burmanensis Breuning, 1932
 Carabus businskyi Deuve, 1990

C

 Carabus caelatus Fabricius, 1801
 Carabus caelestinus (Imura, 2007)
 Carabus caerulans Moravitz, 1886
 Carabus calleyi Fischer, 1823
 Carabus callisthenoides Semenov, 1888
 Carabus camilloi Cavazzuti & Ratti, 1998
 Carabus canaliculatus M.Adams, 1812
 Carabus cancellatus Illiger, 1798
 Carabus candidiequus Imura, 2009
 Carabus cantabricus Chevrolat, 1840
 Carabus cantonensis Hauser, 1918
 Carabus caoyutangicus Deuve, 2009
 Carabus carbonicolor Morawitz, 1886
 Carabus careniger Chaudoir, 1863
 Carabus carinthiacus Sturm, 1815
 Carabus cartereti Deuve, 1982
 Carabus casaleianus Deuve, 1994
 Carabus casanova Imura & Brezina, 2008
 Carabus caschmirensis Redtenbacher, 1844
 Carabus castanopterus A. & J.B. Villa, 1833
 Carabus cateniger A.Morawitz, 1886
 Carabus catenulatus Scopoli, 1763
 Carabus caustomarginatus Imura & Mizusawa, 1994
 Carabus cavazzutiellus Deuve, 2002
 Carabus cavernosus I.Frivaldszky von Frivald, 1838
 Carabus cavifrons Mandl, 1974
 Carabus cechenoides Deuve & Kalab, 2014
 Carabus cenwangensis Deuve & Tian, 2002
 Carabus certus Reitter, 1896
 Carabus chadianus Cavazzuti & Ratti, 1999
 Carabus chamissonis Fischer, 1822
 Carabus chan Breuning, 1934
 Carabus changeonleei Ishikawa & Kim, 1983
 Carabus chaudoiri Gebler, 1847
 Carabus cheni Deuve, 1992
 Carabus chenianus Deuve & Tian, 1999
 Carabus chevrolati Cristoforis & Jan, 1837
 Carabus choui Deuve, 1989
 Carabus chugokuensis (Nakane, 1961)
 Carabus cicatricosulus Morawitz, 1886
 Carabus cicatricosus Fischer, 1842
 Carabus circassicus Ganglbauer, 1886
 Carabus circe Cavazzuti & Ratti, 1998
 Carabus clatratus Linnaeus, 1760
 Carabus clermontianus Breuning, 1933
 Carabus clypeatus M.Adams, 1817
 Carabus coarctatus Brullé, 1836
 Carabus compressus Chaudoir, 1846
 Carabus concolor Fabricius, 1792
 Carabus concursans Deuve & Kaláb, 2010
 Carabus confinis Semenov, 1888
 Carabus constricticollis Kraatz, 1886
 Carabus convallium Starck, 1889
 Carabus convexus Fabricius, 1775
 Carabus coriaceipennis Chaudoir, 1863
 Carabus coriaceus Linnaeus, 1758
 Carabus corrugis Dohrn, 1882
 Carabus coruhnehriensis Cavazzuti, 1990
 Carabus crassesculptus Kraatz, 1881
 Carabus creutzeri Fabricius, 1801
 Carabus cribratus Quensel, 1806
 Carabus cristoforii Spence, 1833
 Carabus croaticus Dejean, 1826
 Carabus cumanus Fischer, 1823
 Carabus curlettii Cavazzuti, 1984
 Carabus cyanipennis Breuning, 1932
 Carabus cychroides Baudi, 1860
 Carabus cychropalpus Peyron, 1858
 Carabus cylindricus Lapouge, 1914

D

 Carabus dabamontanus Imura, 1996
 Carabus dacatraianus Deuve, 1995
 Carabus daisen Nakane, 1953
 Carabus daiyunshan Kleinfeld, 1998
 Carabus danae Kalab, 1995
 Carabus danilevskii Obydov, 1993
 Carabus dapanshanicus Deuve, 2013
 Carabus daphnis Kurnakov, 1962
 Carabus dardiellus Bates, 1889
 Carabus dargei Deuve, 1987
 Carabus datianshanicus Kleinfeld, 1997
 Carabus davidis H.Deyrolle, 1878
 Carabus debilis Semenov, 1897
 Carabus dechambreianus Deuve & Li, 2000
 Carabus decolor Fischer, 1823
 Carabus dehaanii Chaudoir, 1848
 Carabus delavayi Fairmaire, 1886
 Carabus deliae (Morvan, 1972)
 Carabus depressus Schaum, 1856
 Carabus deuveianus Cavazzuti & Casale, 2006
 Carabus dietererberi Heinz, 2001
 Carabus dilatatipennis Rapuzzi & Cavazzuti, 2006
 Carabus dilatotarsalis Mandl, 1979
 Carabus ditomoides Deuve, 1991
 Carabus dokhtouroffi Ganglbauer, 1886
 Carabus dolini Deuve, 1992
 Carabus dolonicus Obydov, 1996
 Carabus dongchuanicus Deuve, 1994
 Carabus donjuan Imura, 2011
 Carabus dorogostaiskii Shilenkov, 1983
 Carabus draco Brezina, 1999
 Carabus drahoslavae Brezina B. & Hackel M., 2006
 Carabus dreuxioides Deuve, 1998
 Carabus dubifer Deuve & Kalab, 2014
 Carabus dufouri Dejean, 1829
 Carabus dungchen Deuve & Kalab, 2019
 Carabus dzhungaricola Deuve, 1989

E-F

 Carabus eccoptopterus Kraatz, 1894
 Carabus edithae Reitter, 1893
 Carabus edmundi Semenov, 1897
 Carabus elbursensis Breuning, 1946
 Carabus elegantulus Motschulsky, 1850
 Carabus elliptipennis Deuve, 1995
 Carabus elysii Thomson, 1856
 Carabus emanuelei Imura, 1997
 Carabus enigmaticus Heinz, 1980
 Carabus eokirgisicus Kabak, 1990
 Carabus eous Morawitz, 1889
 Carabus epipleuralis Semenov, 1907
 Carabus epsteini Heinertz, 1978
 Carabus erberi Heinz, 1983
 Carabus erenleriensis Schweiger, 1966
 Carabus ernsti Kabak, 2001
 Carabus erosus Motschulsky, 1866
 Carabus erwini Mandl, 1975
 Carabus esakii Csiki, 1927
 Carabus estreicheri Fischer, 1822
 Carabus everesti Andrewes, 1929
 Carabus exaratus Quensel, 1806
 Carabus excellens Fabricius, 1798
 Carabus exiguus Semenov, 1898
 Carabus fabricii Panzer, 1812
 Carabus fairmairei Thomson, 1875
 Carabus famini Dejean, 1826
 Carabus faustus Brulle, 1838
 Carabus feae Gestro, 1888
 Carabus fedtschenkoi Solsky, 1874
 Carabus feminus Imura, 2018
 Carabus ferghanicus Breuning, 1933
 Carabus fiduciarius Thomson, 1856
 Carabus finitimus Haldeman, 1852
 Carabus flavigenua Cavazzuti, 2002
 Carabus flavihervosus Imura, 2009
 Carabus flutschi Deuve & Li, 1998
 Carabus fontellus Deuve, 1997
 Carabus foreli Hauser, 1922
 Carabus formosus Semenov, 1887
 Carabus forreri Bates, 1882
 †Carabus foveolatus Piton & Théobald, 1935
 Carabus franzi Mandl, 1974
 Carabus fraterculoides Breuning, 1961
 Carabus fraterculus Reitter, 1895
 Carabus fruhstorferi Roeschke, 1900
 Carabus fubianensis Deuve & Kalab, 2007
 Carabus fumigatus Semenov, 1898
 Carabus fushuangensis Deuve, 1997

G-H

 Carabus galicianus Gory, 1839
 Carabus gandharae Heinertz, 1978
 Carabus gansuensis Semenov, 1887
 Carabus gaschkewitschi Motschulsky, 1859
 Carabus gebleri Fischer, 1817
 Carabus gehinii Fairmaire, 1886
 Carabus gemellatus Ménétriès, 1832
 Carabus gemmifer Fairmaire, 1887
 Carabus genei Géné, 1839
 Carabus gentleman Brezina & Häckel, 2004
 Carabus georgia Cavazzuti, 1984
 Carabus ghiliani La Ferte-Senectere, 1847
 Carabus giachinoi Cavazzuti, 1991
 Carabus gigas Creutzer, 1799
 Carabus gigolo Heinz & Brezina, 1996
 Carabus gigoloides Cavazzuti, 2000
 Carabus gilnickii E.Deyrolle, 1869
 Carabus glabratus Paykull, 1790
 Carabus glyptopterus Fischer, 1827
 Carabus gomerae A.Müller, 2004
 Carabus gonggaicus Deuve, 1989
 Carabus gorodinskii Obydov, 1998
 Carabus goryi Dejean, 1831
 Carabus gossarei Haury, 1879
 Carabus gotschi Chaudoir, 1846
 Carabus gracilicollis Semenov, 1887
 Carabus gracilithorax Deuve, 1989
 Carabus graecus Dejean, 1826
 Carabus granulatocostatus Mandl, 1965
 Carabus granulatus Linnaeus, 1758
 Carabus gratus Semenov, 1887
 Carabus gressittianus Mandl, 1975
 Carabus gridellii Breuning, 1959
 Carabus grombczewskii Semenov, 1891
 Carabus grossefoveatus Hauser, 1913
 Carabus guadarramus LaFerté-Sénectère, 1847
 Carabus guangxicus Deuve, 1989
 Carabus guerini Fischer, 1842
 Carabus guibeicus Deuve & Tian, 1999
 Carabus guinanensis Deuve, 1991
 Carabus gussakovskii Kryzhanovskij, 1971
 Carabus guycolasianus Deuve, 2001
 Carabus gyllenhali Fischer, 1827
 Carabus haeckeli Brezina & Imura, 1997
 Carabus handelmazzettii Mandl, 1955
 Carabus harmandi Vacher de Lapouge, 1909
 Carabus hauseri Reitter, 1894
 Carabus heinzi Breuning, 1964
 Carabus helleri Ganglbauer, 1893
 Carabus hemprichi Dejean, 1826
 Carabus hendrichsi Bolivar y Pieltain; Rotger & Coronado, 1967
 Carabus hengduanicola Deuve, 1996
 Carabus henningi Fischer, 1817
 Carabus hera Kleinfeld, 2000
 Carabus heydenianus Starck, 1889
 Carabus hiekei Kabak & Kryzhanovskij, 1990
 Carabus hiekeianus Deuve, 1991
 Carabus hienfoungi Thomson, 1857
 Carabus hispanus Fabricius, 1787
 Carabus hiurai Kamiyoshi & Mizoguchi, 1960
 Carabus hollbergi Mannerheim, 1827
 Carabus hortensis Linnaeus, 1758
 Carabus huangi Deuve, 1992
 Carabus hubeicus Deuve, 1991
 Carabus humilior Deuve & Kalab, 2012
 Carabus hummeli Fischer, 1823
 Carabus hummelioides Deuve, 1989
 Carabus hunanicola Deuve & Yu, 1992
 Carabus hungaricus Fabricius, 1792

I-K

 Carabus ibericus Fischer, 1823
 Carabus ichangensis Bates, 1889
 Carabus ignimitella Bates, 1888
 Carabus iliensis Kabak, 1994
 Carabus illigeri Dejean, 1826
 Carabus imitator Reitter, 1883
 Carabus impavidus Cavazzuti, 2009
 Carabus imperfectus Semenov, 1887
 Carabus imperialis Fischer, 1823
 Carabus impressus Klug, 1832
 Carabus inagakii Deuve, 1991
 Carabus indicus Fairmaire, 1889
 Carabus indigestus Semenov, 1898
 Carabus infantulus Morawitz, 1886
 Carabus infirmior Hauser, 1924
 Carabus insulicola Chaudoir, 1869
 Carabus intricatus Linnaeus, 1761
 Carabus inventoides Deuve & Li, 2000
 Carabus inventus Cavazzuti, 1999
 Carabus irregularis Fabricius, 1792
 Carabus isabellae Lassalle, 1985
 Carabus ishizukai Deuve & Ohshima, 1989
 Carabus italicus Dejean, 1826
 Carabus iteratus Breuning, 1934
 Carabus itshkibashi Kabak, 2004
 Carabus itzingeri Breuning, 1934
 Carabus iwawakianus (Nakane, 1953)
 Carabus jacobsoni Semenov, 1908
 Carabus janatai Brezina, 1996
 Carabus jankowskii Oberthur, 1883
 Carabus janthinus Ganglbauer, 1887
 Carabus japonicus Motschulsky, 1857
 Carabus jason Semenov, 1898
 †Carabus jeffersoni Scudder, 1900
 Carabus jingliae Deuve & Tian, 2019
 Carabus jingzhongensis Deuve & Tian, 2005
 Carabus jinnanicus Deuve & Tian, 2007
 Carabus jintangicus Deuve, 2001
 Carabus jiudingensis Deuve, 1994
 Carabus jiulongensis Deuve, 1994
 Carabus juengerianus Kleinfeld, 1995
 Carabus juldusanus Breuning, 1933
 Carabus kabakovi Lafer, 1989
 Carabus kadoudali (Morvan, 1982)
 Carabus kadyrbekovi Kabak, 1994
 Carabus kaghanensis Heinertz, 1978
 Carabus kalabellus Deuve, 1993
 Carabus kalabi Deuve, 1990
 Carabus kamensis Semenov, 1903
 Carabus kantaikensis Géhin, 1885
 Carabus karaterekensis Kalab, 1996
 Carabus karkarensis Kabak & Ovtshinnikov, 1994
 Carabus karpinskii Kryzhanovskij & Matveev, 1993
 Carabus kasakorum Semenov, 1897
 Carabus kasantsevi Kabak, 1993
 Carabus kasbekianus Kraatz, 1877
 Carabus katajevi Gottwald, 1989
 Carabus kaufmanni Solsky, 1874
 Carabus kaznakovi Semenov & Znojko, 1932
 Carabus keithi Deuve, 1995
 Carabus khalyktauensis Kabak, 2005
 Carabus khipstaensis Solodovnikov, 2015
 Carabus khorasanensis Deuve, 1993
 Carabus kimurai Ishikawa, 1966
 Carabus kiritschenkoi Breuning, 1934
 Carabus kitawakianus Imura, 1993
 Carabus kitawakiellus Imura, 1995
 Carabus kiukiangensis Bates, 1888
 Carabus klapperichianus Mandl, 1955
 Carabus kleinfeldorum Kabak & Putchkov, 1995
 Carabus koenigi Ganglbauer, 1887
 Carabus koganae Colas, 1961
 Carabus koidei Imura, 1996
 Carabus koiwayai Deuve & Imura, 1990
 Carabus kokujewi Semenov, 1898
 Carabus kolbei Roeschke, 1897
 Carabus kollari Palliardi, 1825
 Carabus koltzei Rost, 1889
 Carabus kolymensis Lafer, 1989
 Carabus komarowi Reitter, 1882
 Carabus komiyai (Ishikawa, 1966)
 Carabus koreanus Reitter, 1895
 Carabus korellianus Kleinfeld, 2002
 Carabus kouanping Maindron, 1906
 Carabus kouichii Imura & Mizusawa, 1997
 Carabus kozhantschikovi Lutshnik, 1924
 Carabus kozloviellus Semenov & Znojko, 1932
 Carabus kratkyi Ganglbauer, 1890
 Carabus kruberi Fischer, 1822
 Carabus kryzhanovskianus Deuve, 1992
 Carabus kryzhanovskii Bogachev, 1965
 Carabus kubani Deuve, 1990
 Carabus kucerai Deuve, 1997
 Carabus kumagai Kimura & Komiya, 1974
 Carabus kurdaiensis Kabak, 2016
 Carabus kurdicus Heinz, 1975
 Carabus kurilensis Vacher de Lapouge, 1913
 Carabus kusnetzovi Semenov, 1903
 Carabus kweitshauensis Mandl, 1975
 Carabus kyushuensis Nakane, 1961

L

 Carabus labrangicus Deuve, 1992
 Carabus ladygini Semenov, 1903
 Carabus laevithorax Breuning, 1935
 Carabus lafossei Feisthamel, 1845
 Carabus lama Semenov, 1898
 Carabus lamarcki Deuve, 1994
 Carabus laoshanicus Imura, 1995
 Carabus laotse Breuning, 1943
 Carabus latiballioni Deuve, 1993
 Carabus latipennis Breuning, 1932
 Carabus latreilleanus Csiki, 1927
 Carabus latreillei Fischer, 1822
 Carabus latro Semenov, 1898
 Carabus lazikouensis Deuve, 1997
 Carabus lazorum Belousov & Zamotajlov, 1999
 Carabus leachi Fischer, 1823
 Carabus lebretae Colas, 1961
 Carabus leda Kleinfeld, 2000
 Carabus lederi Reitter, 1882
 Carabus ledouxi Deuve, 2001
 Carabus leechi Bates, 1888
 Carabus leepai Heinz, 1993
 Carabus legrandianus Deuve & Tian, 2007
 Carabus leplati Deuve & Li, 2008
 Carabus leptoplesioides Deuve, 1992
 Carabus lewisianus Nakane, 1953
 Carabus liianus Deuve, 2008
 Carabus lindemanni Ballion, 1878
 Carabus lineatus Dejean, 1826
 Carabus linnaei Panzer, 1812
 Carabus linxiaensis Deuve, 1992
 Carabus lixianensis Deuve, 1990
 Carabus lizizhongi Deuve & Tian, 2007
 Carabus longeantennatus Hauser, 1931
 Carabus longipedatus Belousov & Kabak, 1993
 Carabus longiusculus Cavazzuti, 2007
 Carabus lopatini Morawitz, 1886
 Carabus loschnikovi Fischer von Waldheim, 1823
 Carabus lucepunctus Cavazzuti & Rapuzzi, 2005
 Carabus ludingensis Deuve & Vigna Taglianti, 1992
 Carabus ludivinae Deuve, 1996
 Carabus luetgensi Beuthin, 1886
 Carabus luschanensis Hauser, 1919
 Carabus lusitanicus Fabricius, 1801

M

 Carabus macleayi Dejean, 1826
 Carabus macrocephaloides (Jeanne, 1972)
 Carabus macrocephalus Dejean, 1826
 Carabus macrogonus Chaudoir, 1847
 Carabus macropus Chaudoir, 1877
 Carabus madefactus Cavazzuti, 1997
 Carabus maeander Fischer, 1822
 Carabus maiyasanus Bates, 1873
 Carabus malaisei Breuning, 1947
 Carabus maleki Deuve, 1991
 Carabus malkovskyi Kabak, 1990
 Carabus manap Brezina & Kabak, 1993
 Carabus mandarin Kalab, 2002
 Carabus mandibularis Fischer, 1827
 Carabus manifestus Kraatz, 1881
 Carabus maoershanicus Cavazzuti, 1995
 Carabus maowenensis Deuve, 2001
 Carabus marcilhacianus Deuve, 2010
 Carabus marginalis Fabricius, 1794
 Carabus marietti Cristoforis & Jan, 1837
 Carabus marquardti Reitter, 1898
 Carabus masahiroi (Imura, 2006)
 Carabus massagetus Motschulsky, 1846
 Carabus masuzoi (Imura & Sato, 1989)
 Carabus maurus Adams, 1817
 †Carabus mecothoracus Zhang, 1989
 Carabus mecynodes Bates, 1890
 Carabus meditabundus Deuve, 1992
 Carabus melancholicus Fabricius, 1798
 Carabus melii Cavazzuti & Ratti, 2005
 Carabus melli Born, 1923
 Carabus mellyi Chaudoir, 1846
 Carabus menelaus Breuning, 1951
 Carabus menetriesi Hummel, 1827
 Carabus merdeniki Cavazzuti & Korell, 1992
 Carabus merkensis Kabak, 1992
 Carabus merzbacheri Hauser, 1922
 Carabus mestscherjakovi Lutshnik, 1924
 Carabus meurguesianus Ledoux, 1990
 Carabus mianningensis Kleinfeld, 2000
 Carabus mianyangensis Deuve & Li, 1998
 Carabus miaorum Lassalle & Prunier, 1993
 Carabus michailovi Kabak, 1992
 Carabus microtatos Cavazzuti, 1997
 Carabus mikhaili Deuve & Mourzine, 1997
 Carabus minimocupreus Deuve, 2003
 Carabus minimus Semenov & Znojko, 1932
 Carabus mirabilissimus Ishikawa & Deuve, 1982
 Carabus miraculix Kleinfeld & Puchner, 2011
 Carabus mirandus Cavazzuti & Rapuzzi, 2005
 Carabus miroslavi Deuve, 2000
 Carabus mniszechi Chaudoir, 1852
 Carabus modestulus Semenov, 1887
 Carabus mollardianus Deuve, 2016
 Carabus mongoliensis Obydov, 2003
 Carabus monilis Fabricius, 1792
 Carabus monticola Dejean, 1826
 Carabus montivagus Palliardi, 1825
 Carabus montreuili Deuve, 2003
 Carabus morawitzianus Semenov, 1887
 Carabus morbillosus Fabricius, 1792
 Carabus morphocaraboides Deuve, 1989
 Carabus mouthiezianoides Deuve & Kalab, 1992
 Carabus mouthiezianus Deuve, 1991
 Carabus mulianus Deuve, 1995
 Carabus mullerellus Beheim & Breuning, 1943
 Carabus mulsantianus Morawitz, 1886
 Carabus munganasti Reitter, 1909

N-O

 Carabus nacharensis Rost, 1893
 Carabus namanganensis Heyden, 1886
 Carabus namhaedoensis Kwon & Lee, 1984
 Carabus nangnimicus Blumenthal & Deuve, 1984
 Carabus nankotaizanus Kano, 1932
 Carabus nanosomus Hauser, 1931
 Carabus nanschanicus Semenov, 1898
 Carabus nanwutai Kleinfeld; Korell & Wrase, 1996
 Carabus narynensis Csiki, 1927
 †Carabus neli Deuve, 1998
 Carabus nemoralis Muller, 1764  (European ground beetle)
 Carabus nestor Breuning, 1934
 Carabus ngi Deuve, 1994
 Carabus nianjuaensis Imura, 2016
 Carabus nikolajevi Kabak, 1998
 Carabus nilkiensis Kabak, 2014
 Carabus nitens Linnaeus, 1758
 Carabus nitididorsus Ishikawa & Kim, 1983
 Carabus noctivagus Deuve, 1992
 Carabus nodulosus Creutzer, 1799
 Carabus nosei Imura, 1997
 Carabus nothus M.Adams, 1817
 Carabus nouristani (Ledoux, 1977)
 †Carabus novalensis Omboni, 1886
 Carabus novenumus Deuve, 1995
 Carabus oblongior Deuve, 1992
 Carabus obovatus Fischer, 1827
 Carabus obsoletus Sturm, 1815
 Carabus odoratus Motschulsky, 1844
 Carabus odysseus Breuning, 1932
 Carabus ohomopteroides Deuve & Tian, 2004
 Carabus ohshimaianus Deuve, 1988
 Carabus olafi Deuve & J.Schmidt, 2007
 Carabus olympiae Sella, 1855
 Carabus omphreodes Reitter, 1898
 Carabus opaculus Putzeys, 1875
 Carabus osawai Imura; Zhou & Su, 1999
 Carabus osseticus M.Adams, 1817
 Carabus ovtchinnikovi Gottwald, 1987

P

 Carabus pachtoun Ledoux, 1975
 Carabus paiafa White, 1845
 Carabus panda Deuve, 1988
 Carabus pangi Deuve & Tian, 1999
 Carabus paris Breuning, 1932
 Carabus parreyssi Palliardi, 1825
 Carabus patroclus Breuning, 1933
 Carabus pauliani Deuve, 2004
 Carabus paulusi Kalab, 1995
 Carabus pavesii Cavazzuti, 1992
 Carabus pawlowskianus Deuve, 1989
 Carabus pedemontanus Ganglbauer, 1892
 Carabus penelope Kleinfeld, 1997
 Carabus pepek Imura & Kalab, 2006
 Carabus perelloi Casale, 1979
 Carabus perrini Dejean, 1831
 Carabus persianus Roeschke, 1896
 Carabus petri Semenov & Znojko, 1932
 Carabus phoenix Vacher de Lapouge, 1925
 Carabus piffli Mandl, 1961
 Carabus pineticola Deuve & Mourzine, 2004
 Carabus piochardi Gehin, 1883
 Carabus pisidicus Peyron, 1854
 Carabus planarius Obydov, 1994
 Carabus planatus Chaudoir, 1843
 Carabus planicollis Küster, 1846
 Carabus plasoni Ganglbauer, 1886
 Carabus platyfluvius Imura, 2012
 Carabus poeta Semenov, 1898
 Carabus polemistes Hauser, 1921
 Carabus politulus Morawitz, 1886
 Carabus polychrous Rost, 1892
 Carabus porrecticollis Bates, 1883
 Carabus potanini (Semenov, 1887)
 Carabus praecellens Palliardi, 1825
 Carabus praecox Semenov, 1898
 Carabus prattianus Bates, 1890
 Carabus principalis Bates, 1889
 Carabus problematicus Herbst, 1786
 Carabus procerulus Chaudoir, 1862
 Carabus prodigus Erichson, 1834
 Carabus promachus Bates, 1891
 Carabus prometheus Reitter, 1887
 Carabus propiorthais Cavazzuti, 2000
 Carabus protenes Bates, 1889
 Carabus protensus Schaum, 1864
 Carabus przewalskii Morawitz, 1886
 Carabus pseudocenwangensis Deuve & Tian, 2005
 Carabus pseudochortenensis Deuve & Tian, 2020
 Carabus pseudoharmandi Mandl, 1965
 Carabus pseudohuangi Deuve, 1995
 Carabus pseudokoreanus Breuning, 1934
 Carabus pseudolamprostus Kalab, 1996
 Carabus pseudolatipennis Deuve, 1991
 Carabus pseudomarkamensis Deuve, 1992
 Carabus pseudomonticola Vacher de Lapouge, 1908
 Carabus pseudoprosodes Semenov & Znojko, 1932
 Carabus pseudopusio Deuve, 1996
 Carabus pseudosackeni Deuve, 1989
 Carabus pseudotorquatus Deuve, 1995
 Carabus pskemicus Deuve & Kalab, 1993
 Carabus puer Morawitz, 1886
 Carabus puetzi Kleinfeld, 2000
 Carabus pukwonensis Deuve & Mourzine, 1993
 Carabus pullus Semenov & Znojko, 1932
 Carabus pumilio Küster, 1846
 Carabus punctatocostulus Deuve & Kaláb, 2018
 Carabus punctatus Laporte, 1834
 Carabus pupulus Morawitz, 1889
 Carabus puschkini M.Adams, 1817
 Carabus pusioides Cavazzuti & Rapuzzi, 2007
 Carabus pustulifer Lucas, 1869
 Carabus pustululatus Deuve, 1993
 Carabus pyrenaeus Audinet-Serville, 1821

Q-R

 Carabus qiangding Kleinfeld & Puchner, 2007
 Carabus qinlingensis Imura, 1993
 Carabus queinneci Deuve, 1983
 Carabus quindecim Cavazzuti, 2002
 Carabus quinlani Mandl, 1965
 Carabus quintus Cavazzuti & Rapuzzi, 2009
 Carabus rapuzzi Kleinfeld, 2000
 Carabus redikortzewi Semenov & Breuning, 1931
 Carabus regalis Fischer, 1822
 Carabus regeli Morawitz, 1886
 Carabus regulus Dohrn, 1882
 Carabus reitteri Retowski, 1885
 Carabus reitterianus Breuning, 1934
 Carabus relictus Semenov, 1898
 Carabus rhododendron Deuve & Imura, 1991
 Carabus riedeli Menetries, 1832
 Carabus riffensis Fairmaire, 1875
 Carabus roborowskii Semenov, 1887
 Carabus robustus E.Deyrolle, 1869
 Carabus roccaianus Deuve, 2011
 Carabus romanowi Semenov, 1897
 Carabus roseni Reitter, 1897
 Carabus roseri Faldermann, 1836
 Carabus rossii Dejean, 1826
 Carabus rostandianus Deuve, 2005
 Carabus rostianus Semenov, 1907
 Carabus rothi Dejean, 1829
 Carabus rueckbeili Breuning, 1934
 Carabus rufocuprescens Deuve, 1993
 Carabus rugosus Fabricius, 1792
 Carabus rugulothorax Deuve, 2016
 Carabus rumelicus Chaudoir, 1867
 Carabus rustemi Kabak, 2009
 Carabus rutilans Dejean, 1826

S

 Carabus sacarum Kabak, 1998
 Carabus sackeni Semenov, 1898
 Carabus sackenioides Deuve, 1991
 Carabus saga Cavazzuti, 1997
 Carabus salpansis Deuve, 1984
 Carabus saphyrinus Cristoforis & Jan, 1837
 Carabus satyrus Kurnakov, 1962
 Carabus saulcyi Piochard, 1875
 Carabus sauteri Roeschke, 1912
 Carabus scabripennis Chaudoir, 1850
 Carabus scabriusculus Olivier, 1795
 Carabus scabrosus Olivier, 1795
 Carabus scheibei Eidam, 1937
 Carabus scheidleri Panzer, 1799
 Carabus schoenherri Fischer, 1822
 Carabus schrencki Motschulsky, 1860
 Carabus schuetzei Kleinfeld, 1998
 Carabus scovitzi Faldermann, 1835
 Carabus sculptior Deuve, 1992
 Carabus sculptipennis Chaudoir, 1887
 Carabus sculpturatus Ménétriès, 1832
 Carabus sehnali Brezina & Häckel, 2006
 Carabus seishinensis Lapouge, 1931
 Carabus semenovianus Breuning, 1934
 Carabus semiopacus Reitter, 1895
 Carabus separatus Vacher de Lapouge, 1907
 Carabus septemcarinatus Motschulsky, 1840
 Carabus seroulikbin Cavazzuti, 2008
 Carabus serratus Say, 1825
 Carabus shaanxiensis Deuve, 1991
 Carabus shaluishan Kleinfeld & Puchner, 2011
 Carabus shamaevi Imura, 1996
 Carabus shirtalensis Gottwald, 1990
 Carabus shokalskii Semenov & Breuning, 1931
 Carabus shtchurovi Belousov & Zamotajlov, 1993
 Carabus shuamaluko Deuve, 1991
 Carabus shun Deuve, 1995
 Carabus sibiricus Fischer, 1822
 Carabus sichuanicola Deuve, 1989
 Carabus sifanicus Semenov, 1898
 Carabus siguniangensis Deuve, 1997
 Carabus simardianus Deuve, 1990
 Carabus sinicus Breuning, 1950
 Carabus sininensis Semenov, 1898
 Carabus sinotibeticola Mandl, 1975
 Carabus slovtzovi Mannerheim, 1849
 Carabus smaragdinus Fischer, 1823
 Carabus sogdianus Semenov, 1898
 Carabus solidior Deuve & Imura, 1990
 Carabus solieri Dejean, 1826
 Carabus solskyi Ballion, 1878
 Carabus sororius Morawitz, 1886
 Carabus spasskianus Fischer, 1823
 Carabus sphinx Reitter, 1895
 Carabus splendens Olivier, 1790
 Carabus stackelbergi Kryzhanovskij, 1971
 Carabus staehlini M.Adams, 1817
 Carabus starcki Heyden, 1885
 Carabus starckianus Ganglbauer, 1886
 Carabus staudingeri Ganglbauer, 1886
 Carabus stenocephalus Lucas, 1866
 Carabus sternbergi Roeschke, 1898
 Carabus steuartii Deyrolle, 1852
 Carabus steveni Menetries, 1832
 Carabus stjernvalli Mannerheim, 1830
 Carabus stoliczkanus Bates, 1878
 Carabus strandiellus Breuning, 1934
 Carabus stroganowi Zoubkoff, 1837
 Carabus stscheglowi Mannerheim, 1827
 Carabus stschurovskii Solsky, 1874
 Carabus subparallelus Ballion, 1878
 Carabus subtilistriatus Hauser, 1922
 Carabus successor Reitter, 1896
 Carabus sui Imura & Zhou, 1998
 Carabus sunwukong Imura, 1993
 Carabus swaneticus Reitter, 1883
 Carabus sylvestris Panzer, 1793
 Carabus sylvosus Say, 1825
 Carabus syriacus L.Redtenbacher, 1843
 Carabus syrus Roeschke, 1898
 Carabus szeli Deuve, 1994

T

 Carabus tadzhikistanus Kryzhanovskij, 1968
 Carabus taedatus Fabricius, 1787
 Carabus taibaiensis Kleinfeld, 2001
 Carabus taibaishanicus Deuve, 1989
 Carabus takashimai Deuve & Imura, 1993
 Carabus taliensis (Fairmaire, 1886)
 Carabus talychensis (Ménétriés, 1832)
 Carabus tamang Deuve, 1983
 Carabus tamsi Menetries, 1832
 Carabus tanakai Imura, 1997
 Carabus tanakaianus (Imura, 2005)
 Carabus tarasovinus Deuve, 2009
 Carabus tarbagataicus Kraatz, 1878
 Carabus tekeliensis Kabak, 2001
 Carabus tekesensis Deuve & Tian, 2004
 Carabus telemachus Hauser, 1925
 Carabus tengchongicola Deuve, 1999
 Carabus tenuitarsis Kraatz, 1877
 Carabus tewoensis Deuve, 1992
 Carabus thais Heinz, 1997
 Carabus theanus Reitter, 1895
 Carabus thianshanskii Breuning, 1934
 Carabus thibetanus Breuning, 1950
 Carabus thilliezi Deuve, 1994
 Carabus thoraciculus Cavazzuti, 1998
 Carabus tianbaoshan Kleinfeld, 1998
 Carabus tiani Deuve, 2013
 Carabus tianshanicola Deuve & Tian, 2003
 Carabus tibetanophilus Deuve, 1991
 Carabus tieguanzi Imura, 1990
 Carabus tientei Thomson, 1857
 Carabus titan Zolotarev, 1913
 Carabus titanus Breuning, 1933
 Carabus tokatensis Roeschke, 1898
 Carabus tonkinensis Deuve, 1990
 Carabus torosus I.Frivaldszky von Frivald, 1835
 Carabus torquatus Cavazzuti, 1995
 Carabus toulgoeti Deuve, 1989
 Carabus trachynodes Bates, 1891
 Carabus transiliensis Semenov, 1897
 Carabus trichothorax Brezina & Imura, 1997
 Carabus truncaticollis Eschscholtz, 1833
 Carabus tryznai Brezina & Häckel, 2006
 Carabus tsharynensis Kabak, 1994
 Carabus tshistjakovae Kabak, 2001
 Carabus tsogoensis Deuve, 1997
 Carabus tuberculipennis Mandl, 1974
 Carabus tuberculosus Dejean, 1829
 Carabus turcomanorum Thieme, 1881
 Carabus turcosinensis Mandl, 1955
 Carabus turkestanus Breuning, 1929
 Carabus turnaianus Deuve, 1995
 Carabus tuvensis Shilenkov, 1996
 Carabus tuxeni Mandl, 1979

U-Z

 Carabus uenoi Ishikawa, 1960
 Carabus uenoianus Imura, 1995
 Carabus ullrichii Germar, 1824
 Carabus vagans Olivier, 1795
 Carabus validus Kraatz, 1884
 Carabus valikhanovi Kabak, 1990
 Carabus vanvolxemi Putzeys, 1875
 Carabus variabilis Ballion, 1878
 Carabus varians Fischer, 1827
 Carabus variolosus Fabricius, 1787
 Carabus venustus Morawitz, 1862
 Carabus verecundus Deuve & Kalab, 2010
 Carabus viatorum Deuve, 1992
 Carabus victor Fischer, 1836
 Carabus vietinghoffi Adams, 1812
 Carabus vigil Semenov, 1898
 Carabus vigilax Bates, 1890
 Carabus vinctus Weber, 1801
 Carabus violaceus Linnaeus, 1758
 Carabus viridifossulatus Fairmaire, 1887
 Carabus viridilimbatus Motschulsky 1859
 Carabus vitalisi Vacher de Lapouge, 1918
 Carabus vladimirskyi Dejean & Boisduval, 1830
 Carabus vogtae Beheim & Breuning, 1943
 Carabus vogtianus Beheim & Breuning, 1943
 Carabus wagae Fairmaire, 1882
 Carabus wallichi Hope, 1831
 Carabus wangziensis Deuve & Tian, 2005
 Carabus watanabei (Imura, 2003)
 Carabus wengdaensis Kleinfeld & Puchner, 2009
 Carabus wenxianicola Deuve, 1996
 Carabus wittmerorum Heinertz, 1978
 Carabus worahniki Kleinfeld & Puchner, 2011
 Carabus wrzecionkoianus Deuve, 2007
 Carabus wulffiusi Morawitz, 1862
 Carabus wumingensis Deuve, 1992
 Carabus wusunshanicus Kabak, 2015
 Carabus wutaishanicus Muller, 2000
 Carabus xianhensis Deuve & Tian, 2007
 Carabus xiaoxiangensis Deuve, 1995
 Carabus xiei Deuve, 1992
 Carabus xiuyanensis Deuve & Li, 1998
 Carabus xupuensis Kleinfeld, 1998
 Carabus yaconinus Bates, 1873
 Carabus yamato Nakane, 1953
 Carabus yaophilus Deuve, 1990
 Carabus yaorenensis Deuve, 2011
 Carabus yinjiangicus Deuve & Tian, 2001
 Carabus yokoae Deuve, 1988
 Carabus yonganensis Deuve, 2008
 Carabus yuae Deuve, 1989
 Carabus yuanbaoensis Deuve, 1994
 Carabus yunanensis Born, 1905
 Carabus yundongbeicus Deuve, 2002
 Carabus yunlingensis Deuve, 1991
 Carabus yunnanicola Deuve, 1989
 Carabus yunnanus Fairmaire, 1886
 Carabus yushuensis Deuve, 1991
 Carabus zarudnyi Semenov & Znojko, 1932
 Carabus zawadzkii Kraatz, 1854
 Carabus zengae Deuve & Tian, 2000
 Carabus zhangjieae Deuve & Li, 2020
 Carabus zhanglaensis Deuve, 1991
 Carabus zhubajie Imura, 1993
 Carabus znojkoi Semenov & Breuning, 1931

References

 Boleslav Brezina (1999) World catalogue of the genus Carabus L. (Coleoptera, Carabidae) Pensoft Series. Faunistica, No 15. Pensoft, Sofia - Moscow 
 Thierry Deuve (2007) Liste Blumenthal 2007 (Liste de taxons valides du genre Carabus L., 1758). Musée national d'histoire naturelle, Paris

Further reading

External links
 Carabus.eu
 Key to the British species of genus Carabus

 
Taxa named by Carl Linnaeus
Taxonomy articles created by Polbot
Carabidae genera